Andrew Susman is an American communications executive. He co-founded and served as the CEO of Studio One Networks. Studio One has been called "one of, if not the pioneer in the field of digital content marketing services," now a $200 billion industry. He lives mainly in Manhattan and the Midwest.

Career 

Susman served as CEO of Studio One Networks, where he built a network of over 2500 websites with partners including AOL, Yahoo!, NBC, CBS, FOX, ABC, and marketers including Procter & Gamble, Home Depot, American Express, Kellogg's, Ford, and the White House. On October 7, 2014, Susman's company, Studio One Networks was acquired.  Prior to its acquisition, Studio One was cited by Procter & Gamble at the Federal Trade Commission as the gold standard in consumer transparency.

Susman currently serves as Founding Chief Operating Officer of the Institute for Advertising Ethics and through New Value Associates, is involved with alternative projects and companies. Susman also serves on the Advertising Educational Foundation Board of Directors, a unit of the Association of National Advertisers.  Susman founded and served as co-chair of the Advertising Transparency & Trust Forum, a multilateral industry working group formed in a meeting at the United Nations on March 30, 2017, to restore transparency and trust in the industry.

Susman previously served as an executive at Time Inc. New Media and Young & Rubicam.

Susman Family 

Susman was born into the Susman family of St. Louis, Missouri, the son of Frank Susman (Susman, Schermer, Rimmel & Shifrin). Mr. Susman argued nine cases before the U.S. Supreme Court, and is the only attorney in history to have been invited or permitted to argue two separate cases before the Supreme Court on the same day. Susman was known for supporting country over party. In one example, in March 1976, Susman argued against John Danforth, the Republican Attorney General of Missouri, in the U.S. Supreme Court. Then, six months later, in October 1976, back in Missouri, Susman joined with August Busch III to form "Democrats for Danforth." On November 2, 1976, Mr. Danforth was elected and served for three terms as Republican Senator for Missouri, prior to his service as Ambassador to the United Nations.

Mr. Susman's mother, Marilyn Susman is a Professor Emerita of Psychology at Loyola University, and Fulbright Scholar of the United States Department of State. Ms. Susman studied under Abraham Maslow.

Mr. Susman's grandfather, Earl Susman (Susman, Willer, Rimmel & Parker), served and was of counsel on Shelley vs. Kraemer, a landmark U.S. Supreme Court ruling, and argued by Thurgood Marshall, which made housing discrimination illegal. Susman served as President of the Jewish Federation of St. Louis.

In addition to the United States Supreme Court, the family has also served in two Anglo-American courts. Notable family members include Louis Susman, the former Ambassador to the Court of St. James (United Kingdom), nominated by Barack Obama, and Karen Hantze Susman, winner of the 1962 women's singles title on Centre Court at the Wimbledon Championship.

In Africa, Susman Brothers founded, owned, and operated several large businesses including mining interests, ranches, and agribusinesses. The Susman business empire lasted over a century by overcoming logistical difficulties, physically challenging obstacles, and political changes. Susman Brothers developed an extensive trading and transport network, which stretched from Botswana to the Democratic Republic of the Congo. In 1925, Harry Susman and King Litunga Yeta III received the Prince of Wales on the occasion of his visit.

Personal life 
Susman was put forward by Martha Nussbaum as a visiting student of ancient philosophy and rhetoric at Oxford University, studying under J.L. Ackrill, an English philosopher and classicist, and Fellow of the British Academy, Margaret Hubbard, who has been described as "one of the most distinguished classical scholars of the modern age," and Peter Birks, Queen's Counsel, who advanced the English law of Restitution, and is often considered to have been one of the greatest English legal scholars of the 20th century.

Susman earned a Bachelor of Arts in Ethics and Political Philosophy at Brown University. Susman earned a Diploma of Business Studies at the London School of Economics.

References

Living people
American technology executives
Digital technology
1968 births
Businesspeople from St. Louis
Brown University alumni
Alumni of the London School of Economics